Carlos A. Scanavino Villavicenio (born March 11, 1964) is a former international freestyle swimmer from Uruguay.

He participated in two consecutive Summer Olympics for his native country, starting in 1984. His best result was the 12th place in the Men's 400m Freestyle Relay in Seoul, South Korea.

References
 

1964 births
Living people
Uruguayan people of Italian descent
Swimmers at the 1979 Pan American Games
Swimmers at the 1983 Pan American Games
Swimmers at the 1984 Summer Olympics
Swimmers at the 1987 Pan American Games
Swimmers at the 1988 Summer Olympics
Swimmers at the 1991 Pan American Games
Olympic swimmers of Uruguay
Pan American Games silver medalists for Uruguay
Pan American Games bronze medalists for Uruguay
Sportspeople from Paysandú
Uruguayan male freestyle swimmers
Pan American Games medalists in swimming
Medalists at the 1983 Pan American Games
Medalists at the 1987 Pan American Games